Daniel Popescu may refer to:

Dan Popescu (born 1988), Romanian footballer
Ilie Daniel Popescu (born 1983), Romanian gymnast
Daniel Popescu (politician) (born 1981), Romanian politician
Daniel Florentin Popescu (born 1993), Romanian football goalkeeper
Dan Ioan Popescu (born 1949), Romanian businessman and politician